The following are considered ocean essential climate variables (ECVs) by the Ocean Observations Panel for Climate (OOPC) that are currently feasible with current observational systems .

Ocean climate variables

Atmosphere surface 
 Air Temperature 
 Precipitation (meteorology) 
 Evaporation
 Air Pressure, sea level pressure (SLP) 
 Surface radiative fluxes 
 Surface thermodynamic fluxes 
 Wind speed and direction 
 Surface wind stress 
 Water vapor

Ocean surface 
 Sea surface temperature (SST) 	
 Sea surface salinity (SSS) 
 Sea level 	
 Sea state  	
 Sea ice  	
 Ocean current  	
 Ocean color (for biological activity)  	
 Carbon dioxide partial pressure (pCO2)

Ocean subsurface 
 Backscatter
 Carbon Dioxide
 Chlorophyll
 Conductivity
 Density
 Iron
 Irradiance
 Nutrients
 Nitrate
 Methane
 Ocean current
 Single Point
 Water Column
 Ocean tracers
 Oxygen
 Phytoplankton
 Salinity
 Sigma-T
 Sound Velocity
 Temperature
 Turbidity

Ocean observation sources

Satellite 
There is a composite network of satellites that generate observations. These include:

In situ
There is a composite network of in situ observations. These include:

Subsurface 

There is a composite network of subsurface observations. These include:

Accuracy of measurements 
The quality of in situ measurements is non-uniform across space, time and platforms. Different platforms employ a large variety of sensors, which operate in a wide range of often hostile environments and use different measurement protocols. Occasionally, buoys are left unattended for extended periods of time, while ships may involve a certain amount of the human-related impacts in data collection and transmission. Therefore, quality control is necessary before in situ data can be further used in scientific research or other applications. This is an example of quality control and monitoring of sea surface temperatures measured by ships and buoys, the iQuam system developed at NOAA/NESDIS/STAR, where statistics show the quality of in situ measurements of sea surface temperatures.

One of the problems facing real-time ocean observatories is the ability to provide a fast and accurate assessment of the data quality. Ocean Networks Canada is in the process of implementing real-time quality control on incoming data. For scalar data, the aim is to meet the guidelines of the Quality Assurance of Real Time Oceanographic Data (QARTOD) group. QARTOD is a US organization tasked with identifying issues involved with incoming real-time data from the U.S Integrated Ocean Observing System (IOOS). A large portion of their agenda is to create guidelines for how the quality of real-time data is to be determined and reported to the scientific community. Real-time data quality testing at Ocean Networks Canada includes tests designed to catch instrument failures and major spikes or data dropouts before the data is made available to the user. Real-time quality tests include meeting instrument manufacturer's standards and overall observatory/site ranges determined from previous data. Due to the positioning of some instrument platforms in highly productive areas, we have also designed dual-sensor tests e.g. for some conductivity sensors. The quality control testing is split into 3 separate categories. The first category is in real-time and tests the data before the data are parsed into the database. The second category is delayed-mode testing where archived data are subject to testing after a certain period of time. The third category is manual quality control by an Ocean Networks Canada data expert.

Historical data available 
OceanSITES  manages a set of links to various sources of available ocean data, including: the Hawaiian Ocean Timeseries (HOT), the JAMSTEC Kuroshio Extension Observatory (JKEO),  Line W monitoring the North Atlantic's deep western boundary current, and others.

This site includes links to the ARGO Float Data, The Data Library and Archives (DLA), the Falmouth Monthly Climate Reports, Martha's Vineyard Coastal Observatory, the Multibeam Archive, the Seafloor Data and Observation Visualization Environment (SeaDOVE): A Web-served GIS Database of Multi-scalar Seafloor Data, Seafloor Sediments Data Collection, the Upper Ocean Mooring Data Archive, the U.S. GLOBEC Data System, U.S. JGOFS Data System, and the WHOI Ship Data-Grabber System.

There are a variety of data sets in a data library listed at Columbia University:

This library includes:
 LEVITUS94 is the World Ocean Atlas as of 1994, an atlas of objectively analyzed fields of major ocean parameters at the annual, seasonal, and monthly time scales. It is superseded by WOA98.
 NOAA NODC WOA98 is the World Ocean Atlas as of 1998, an atlas of objectively analyzed fields of major ocean parameters at monthly, seasonal, and annual time scales. Superseded by WOA01.
 NOAA NODC WOA01 is the World Ocean Atlas 2001, an atlas of objectively analyzed fields of major ocean parameters at monthly, seasonal, and annual time scales. Replaced by WOA05.
 NOAA NODC WOA05 is the World Ocean Atlas 2005, an atlas of objectively analyzed fields of major ocean parameters at monthly, seasonal, and annual time scales.

In situ observations spanning from the early 1700s to present are available from the International Comprehensive Ocean Atmosphere Data Set (ICOADS).

This data set includes observations of a number of the surface ocean and atmospheric variables from ships, moored and drifting buoys and C-MAN stations.

In 2006, Ocean Networks Canada began collecting high-resolution in-situ measurements from the seafloor in Saanich Inlet, near Victoria, British Columbia, Canada. Monitoring sites were later extended to the Strait of Georgia and 5 locations off the West coast of Vancouver Island, British Columbia, Canada. All historical measurements are freely available via Ocean Networks Canada's data portal, Oceans 2.0.

Future developments
Areas requiring research and development
 Satellite observations with higher resolution and accuracy and more spectral bands from geostationary satellites
 improved capability for ocean color observations in coastal and turbid waters
 improved interpretation of sea-ice data from satellites
 satellite measurement of salinity
 Observing system evaluation and design, including improvements in air-sea flux parameterizations.
 Improvements in ocean platforms, including increased capabilities for Argo floats
 improved glider technology and mooring technology.
 New development in ocean sensors and systems, including improved bio-fouling protection, autonomous water sampling systems, optical and acoustic systems, airborne variable sensors, and two-way, low-cost, low-power telecommunications.
 New and improved capability to measure biogeochemical variables, nutrients, and dissolved oxygen and carbon dioxide, as well as to identify organisms.
 Improved instruments, including near-surface current meters, in-water radiometers, sensors for air-sea interface variables and turbulent fluxes, and VOS sensor systems.

The future of oceanic observation systems:
 Guided unmanned underwater vehicles

Organizations

 GOOS (The Global Ocean Observing System)   
 GCOS (Global Climate Observing System)
 IOOS (Integrated Ocean Observing System)
 Argo
 GODAE (Global Ocean Data Experiment)
 Ocean Networks Canada
 OOPC (Ocean Observations Panel for Climate)
 OOI (Ocean Observatories Initiative)
 FixO3 (Fixed-Point Open Ocean Observatories)

See also
Offshore survey

References

Oceanography
Earth observation